is the most common name given to the region comprising the metropolitan areas of the cities of Fukuoka and Kitakyushu in Fukuoka Prefecture, Japan and in between.  Alternate names are many, including Kitakyushu-Fukuoka Greater Metropolitan Region (北九州・福岡大都市圏), Northern Part of Kyushu Greater Metropolitan Region (北部九州大都市圏)

One reason for complications in naming is because the whole region itself was once referred to as "Kitakyushu", which had become ambiguous after the city merger in 1963 which created the city by the same name.

These cities may be referred to separately, but often are lumped together since they are close and lie in the same prefecture.  Furthermore, their economic spheres, infrastructure, and transport links overlap.  Note that the metro areas include the tip of Honshu island (Shimonoseki on Honshu is a significant suburb of Kitakyushu), as well as the northern part of Kyushu.  The definition of Northern Kyushu is not a superset of Fukuoka–Kitakyushu; among the ways it differs: it generally does not include any cities on Honshu island.

Definition
The region consists of the following areas:

 The Ube region may or may not be considered part of this region, depending on definition
 Note:  The cities of Ōita, Sasebo, Kumamoto are never included as being part of Fukuoka–Kitakyushu, despite their relative proximity to Fukuoka and Kitakyushu, rather, they are part of Northern Kyūshū.

Trends

There is a trend for concentration near Fukuoka, with the other areas declining in importance.

Transport

References

Metropolitan areas of Japan
Kyushu region